Ivan Michael "Maca" Ramos is a Belizean politician and a member of the People's United Party (PUP). He was elected in March 2012 as Area Representative for the Dangriga constituency in the Stann Creek District.

In June 2015 Ramos resigned after controversially failing to retain his standard bearer status in Dangriga for the 2015 general election. A by-election to succeed Ramos was held on 8 July.

Ramos is a grandson of noted 20th Century Garifuna activist T. V. Ramos.

References

Year of birth missing (living people)
Living people
People from Dangriga
Garifuna people
People's United Party politicians
Members of the Belize House of Representatives for Dangriga